Tirong Aboh (died 21 May 2019) was an Indian politician from the state of Arunachal Pradesh.

Aboh was elected from Khonsa West seat in the 2014 Arunachal Pradesh Legislative Assembly election, standing as a People's Party of Arunachal candidate. He and his son were among 11 people shot dead by unknown militants, on 21 May 2019, in the Bogapani area of the Tirap district.

See also
Arunachal Pradesh Legislative Assembly

References

External links
Tirong Aboh profile
MyNeta Profile
Janpratinidhi Profile

1978 births
2019 deaths
People's Party of Arunachal politicians
Arunachal Pradesh MLAs 2014–2019
National People's Party (India) politicians
Assassinated Indian politicians
Arunachal Pradesh MLAs 2019–2024